Margaret Warriner Buck (April 29, 1857 - April 5, 1929) was a botanical artist known as a specialist in depicting California wildflowers.

Biography
Buck was born Margaret Warriner in New York, New York, in 1857. She studied art at Yale Art School before moving to San Francisco in 1891. She gained a reputation as a botanical artist and specialist in depicting California wildflowers. In the 1890s, she and writer Mary Elizabeth Parsons hiked around California with an eye to publishing a book about California flora. The result was the very successful The Wild Flowers of California: Their Names, Haunts, and Habits (1897), written by Parsons with over 100 illustrations  engraved from Buck's pen-and-ink drawings. It went through many printings and several editions and was still being reprinted into the 1950s.

After the San Francisco Earthquake of 1906, she worked for Sunset magazine. She died in San Rafael, California, in 1929.

References

1857 births
1929 deaths
19th-century American women artists
20th-century American women artists
Botanical illustrators
Artists from New York City